Isadelphina retracta is a moth of the  family Erebidae.

Distribution
It is found in Congo and Zambia.

References

Calpinae